Fell system may refer to:
 Fell mountain railway system designed by John Barraclough Fell
 British Rail 10100 designed by Lt Col L F R Fell